A minister is a politician who heads a ministry, making and implementing decisions on policies in conjunction with the other ministers. In some jurisdictions the head of government is also a minister and is designated the ‘prime minister’, ‘premier’, ‘chief minister’, ‘chancellor’ or other title.

In Commonwealth realm jurisdictions which use the Westminster system of government, ministers are usually required to be members of one of the houses of Parliament or legislature, and are usually from the political party that controls a majority in the lower house of the legislature. In other jurisdictions—such as Belgium, Mexico, Netherlands, Philippines, Slovenia, and Nigeria—the holder of a cabinet-level post or other government official is not permitted to be a member of the legislature. Depending on the administrative arrangements in each jurisdiction, ministers are usually heads of a government department and members of the government's ministry, cabinet and perhaps of a committee of cabinet. Some ministers may be more senior than others, and some may hold the title ’assistant minister’ or ‘deputy minister’. Some jurisdictions, with a large number of ministers, may designate ministers to be either in the inner or outer ministry or cabinet.

In some jurisdictions—such as Hong Kong, Mexico, the Philippines, the United Kingdom, and the United States—holders of an equivalent cabinet-level post are called secretaries (e.g., the Home Secretary in the United Kingdom, Secretary of State in the United States). Some holders of a cabinet-level post may have another title, such as ’Attorney-General’ or ’Postmaster-General’.

Etymology

The term ’minister’ also is used in diplomacy, for a diplomat of the second class, such as in the title Minister Plenipotentiary, ranking between an Ambassador and a Minister Resident.

The term minister comes from Middle English, deriving from the Old French word ministre, originally minister in Latin, meaning "servant, attendant", which itself was derived from the word 'minus' meaning "less".

In jurisdictions that use the Westminster system of government—such as the United Kingdom and Australia—ministers or their equivalents are selected from the legislature, and usually from the political party that controls a majority in the lower house of the legislature. In jurisdictions with strict separation of powers—such as Belgium, Mexico, Netherlands, Philippines, and the United States—ministers cannot be members of the legislature, and a legislator chosen to become a minister must resign from the legislature.

Normally the leader of the majority party becomes the prime minister, or an office of equivalent function, and selects the other ministers. In the Westminster system, these ministers continue to represent their constituency in parliament while being part of the government. Individuals who are not in parliament may be appointed as a minister, usually in order to bring special skills to the government.

In the United Kingdom, a government minister does not have to be a member of either House of Parliament. In practice, however, convention is that ministers must be members of either the House of Commons or House of Lords in order to be accountable to Parliament. From time to time, Prime Ministers appoint non-parliamentarians as ministers. In recent years such ministers have been appointed to the House of Lords.

Types of ministers and their name
Various countries form ministries as Cabinets (see List of cabinets). Other cabinets are usually included in Politics of ..-articles

 Lists of incumbents groups lists of ministers by country

Specific ministers include:

 Agriculture minister
 Commerce minister
 Communications minister
 Culture minister
 Defence minister
 Deputy prime minister
 Education minister
 Energy minister
 Environment minister
 Finance minister
 Foreign minister
Housing minister
 Health minister
 Industry minister
 Interior minister
 Justice minister
 Labour minister
 Prime minister
 Public works minister
 Science minister
 Sports minister
 Tourism minister
 Transport minister

Some ministers may hold multiple portfolios and lead several ministries simultaneously, while multiple ministers with separate portfolios may oversee a single ministry, or may also share both ministerial and deputy-ministerial portfolios in different ministries. A cabinet minister can sometimes be in charge of no ministry at all, and is then known as a "minister without portfolio".

See also
 Minister of the Crown
 Ministry (government department)
 Ministry (collective executive)

Notes

References

 
Government occupations